William Gourley may refer to:
 William H. Gourley (1933–2008), United States Army general
 William D. Gourley (1937–2014), American football coach and sportscaster